Relangi (రేలంగి) may refer to:

 Relangi, West Godavari district, village in Andhra Pradesh 
 Relangi, Visakhapatnam district, another village in Andhra Pradesh
 Relangi Narasimha Rao (born 1951), Telugu film director
 Relangi (born 1910–1975), Indian character actor, comedian and producer known for his works predominantly in Telugu cinema
 Relangi Selvarajah (1960–2005), Tamil broadcaster and actress

Surnames of Indian origin